Northern Borders is a 2013 American drama film written and directed by Jay Craven, and based on Howard Frank Mosher's novel of the same name. It stars Bruce Dern, Geneviève Bujold and Seamus Davey-Fitzpatrick.

Plot
In 1956, Austen Kittredge is sent to live with his conservative grandparents in Vermont. Austen Sr. and Abiah have lived together for fifty years, but they would not speak to each other directly and actually despise each other. Austen, called "Tut" by his Egypt-obsessed grandmother (the daughters are Nefertiti and Cleopatra), must do farm chores, even though he dislikes the idea. Austen goes to school and meets Theresa, whose family is poor. In addition to dealing a conflict between his grandparents, Austen deals with their efforts to overcome reluctance to join the modern world.

Cast
Bruce Dern as Austen Kittredge Sr.
Geneviève Bujold as Abiah Kittredge
Seamus Davey-Fitzpatrick as Austen Kittredge II
Tom Bodett as Station Master
Samantha Cheirif as Bumper Stevens' Girlfriend
Brent Crawford as Rob
Rusty DeWees as Bumper Stevens
Jim Fitzpatrick as JW Kittredge
John Griesemer as Bailiff
Jessica Hecht as Liz Kittredge
Jacqueline Hennessy as Theresa Dubois
Alicia Hunt as Nefertiti
John Kiedaisch as Zack Barrows
Nettie Lane as Mrs. Dubois
Mark Margolis as Whiskeyjack Kittredge
Tara O'Reilly as Nurse
Kaley Ronayne as Cleopatra
John Rothman as Judge Allen
Jay O. Sanders as Agent Sanders
Irene Shamas as Hettie
John Shea as Doc Harrison
Karin Shearer as Mrs. Armstrong

Reception
On review aggregator Rotten Tomatoes, the film holds an approval rating of 40% based on five reviews, with an average rating of 6.08/10." On Metacritic, the film has a weighted average score of 44 out of 100, based on four critics, indicating "mixed or average reviews".

Peter Keough of The Boston Globe wrote, "Craven's erratic tonal shifts from the whimsical to the sentimental trip up the episodic plot." Neil Genzlinger of The New York Times wrote, "The most interesting thing about the movie is its origin story."

References

External links
 
 

2013 films
American drama films
Films set in Vermont
Films based on American novels
2010s English-language films
2010s American films